Jung So-min (born Kim Yoon-ji on March 16, 1989) is a South Korean actress. She made her acting debut in 2010 with a supporting role in the television series Bad Guy. She is known for her leading role in her 2010 TV series Playful Kiss, the Korean adaptation of the popular manga Itazura na Kiss. Jung is also known for her roles in the television series My Father Is Strange, Because This Is My First Life, The Smile Has Left Your Eyes, Soul Mechanic, and Alchemy of Souls, as well as the film Twenty.

Career

Jung first attracted attention when she made her acting debut in 2010 with a supporting role in the television series Bad Guy. This led to a leading role in her next project Playful Kiss, the Korean adaptation of the popular manga Itazura na Kiss. Though it received low ratings in Korea, the romantic comedy was popular overseas, further raising Jung's profile.

Jung then took a short break in 2011 to concentrate on her studies at the Korea National University of Arts. In 2012, she returned to the small screen as part of the ensemble cast of the sitcom Standby. Later that year, she played a more mature role opposite Sung Joon in the cable series Can We Get Married?.

Jung left her talent agency Bloom Entertainment in 2013 and joined SM Culture & Contents. She then appeared in Came to Me and Became a Star, a single-episode anthology Drama Special.

In 2014, Jung played a self-centered heiress who falls for the protagonist (played by Kang Ji-hwan) in Big Man. This was followed in 2015 by a supporting role in coming-of-age film Twenty, and leading roles in horror-romance film Alice: Boy from Wonderland and disaster-medical drama D-Day.

Jung starred in a Drama Special The Red Teacher in 2016. She was then cast as the female lead in The Sound of Your Heart opposite Lee Kwang-soo in December of the same year. The web drama was a success in China and gained more than 100 million views on Sohu.

In 2017, Jung was cast in KBS weekend family drama My Father is Strange. She also starred in the body-swap comedy Daddy You, Daughter Me opposite veteran actor Yoon Je-moon. She then left SM Culture & Contents in June and signed with new management agency Jellyfish Entertainment. In August, she confirmed her appearance in tvN's romantic comedy series Because This Is My First Life alongside Lee Min-ki. She also released an OST "Because You Are Beside Me" for the drama.

Jung was chosen to play the lead role in The Smile Has Left Your Eyes in 2018. This is an adaptation of the 2002 Japanese television series Sora Kara Furu Ichioku no Hoshi where she also recorded an OST "Star" with her co-star, Seo In-guk. The same year, she was cast in the historical comedy flick Homme Fatale. She wrapped up 2018 with her first radio show Jung So Min's Young Street on SBS Power FM, thus achieving her dream to become a radio DJ someday.

Jung left Jellyfish Entertainment in August 2019 and signed with another management company Blossom Entertainment. She then became a cast member in a healing variety program Little Forest, which is designed as a home kids garden development project for children. In December, she stepped down from her DJ post in Jung So Min's Young Street.

In 2020, Jung starred in the medical drama Soul Mechanic alongside Shin Ha-kyun where she portrayed a musical rising star with terrible anger management issues.

In 2021, she did a cameo in Park Joon-hwa's fantasy romantic comedy My Roommate Is a Gumiho, appearing as the woman whom protagonist Jang Ki-yong loved in the past. She also appeared in TV romance drama Monthly Magazine Home opposite Kim Ji-seok as an editor of a lifestyle magazine 'Monthly House'.

In 2022, Jung returned to the small screen with the tvN period fantasy drama Alchemy of Souls where she played a skilled assassin whose soul is trapped inside the body of servant girl, alongside Lee Jae-wook. In August, Jung signed with TH Company. In September, Jung returned to the big screen for the first time in three years with the sci-fi film Project Wolf Hunting.

Filmography

Film

Television series

Television shows

Radio shows

Theater

Discography

Singles

Audio books

Awards and nominations

References

External links
 
 
 

South Korean television actresses
South Korean film actresses
South Korean web series actresses
1989 births
Actresses from Seoul
Korea National University of Arts alumni
21st-century South Korean actresses
Living people